Farewell Ferengistan is an album by Banco de Gaia. It was released on July 4, 2006 on Six Degrees Records.

Track listing

References

2006 albums
Banco de Gaia albums
Six Degrees Records albums